Leucanopsis terranea is a moth of the family Erebidae. It was described by Walter Rothschild in 1909. It is found in Brazil and Ecuador.

References

terranea
Moths described in 1909